La Capuera is a town of the Maldonado Department in Uruguay.

Geography
The town is located on the coast of the lake Laguna del Sauce, near kilometre 120 of Route 93, about 18 kilometres west of the capital city, Maldonado and just west of the Laguna del Sauce International Airport.

Population
In 2011, La Capuera had a population of 2,838.
 
Source: Instituto Nacional de Estadística de Uruguay

See also
 Maldonado Department

References

External links
INE map of Sauce de Portezuelo, Ocean Park, Chihuahua and La Capuera

Populated places in the Maldonado Department